Do Lafzon Ki Kahani is an Indian television series that aired on Sahara TV. The story revolves around three generations of a family: a mother played by Helen, her adoptive daughter played by Samyukta Singh, and her granddaughter. The series premiered on 20 June 2001 and stars Bollywood film actress Helen from the movie “salaami “  Samyukta Jas Aman

Cast
 Helen Jairag Richardson as Monica Stevens
Samyukta Singh as  Antara (Monica's adopted daughter)
 Aman Verma as Raj
 Jas Arora as Aryan

References

External links
 

Sahara One original programming
Indian drama television series
2001 Indian television series debuts